Expedition of Khalid ibn al-Walid, to Najran, took place in 10AH of the Islamic Calendar, Around June 631 AD.

The event is mentioned partly in the Quran verse 3:61. The event is also mentioned by the Muslim jurist Tabari, who mentions that Muhammad wrote a letter to Khalid ibn al-Walid. Those letters are also mentioned by Muhammad Hamidullah in his French book Six Originaux des letters diplomatiques du Prophete e l'Islam, which contains a collection of six of the Muhammad's letters whose original texts have been preserved, that he compiled. Muhammad Hamidullah considered the letters authentic.  The translator of Tabari, Volume 9, The last Years of the Prophet, Isma'il Qurban Husayn, mentions in the footnote on page 83, that the letter mentioned by Tabari is also in the texts collected by Muhammad Hamidullah.

Background
Najran consisted of Christian tribes, and polytheist tribes. A year before this Expedition, the Christian portion of the Banu al-Harith sent a delegation led by a bishop. The Christian delegation started to debate with Muhammad, claiming that Jesus was the son of God. According to Ibn Kathir, the Quran verse 3:61 was "revealed" about this event:

The delegation refused to convert to Islam, it is reported that one of Muhammad's companion said to the Christians: If you have already decided that you will remain in your religion and your creed regarding your fellow (`Isa), then conduct a treaty with the man (Muhammad) and go back to your land.' [Quote referenced in Tafsir ibn Kathir]

According to Ar-Rahīq al-Makhtum (The Sealed Nectar), a modern Islamic hagiography of Muhammad written by the Indian Muslim author Saif ur-Rahman Mubarakpuri, having refused to convert to Islam, Muhammad ordered the tribe to pay the Jizyah and give Muhammad 2,000 garments, in exchange for peace and security. A part of the tribe were still practising Idolatry, and Muhammad only had a treaty with the Christian part of the tribe, so he sent Khalid ibn Walid with a group of armed men to call on the rest of the tribe to embrace Islam. William Muir also claims that Muhammad told Khalid to attack them if they refused to convert.

Expedition
When Khalid arrived at the destination he sent armed men on horses on all directions to proclaim to the people:
Ye people! Embrace Islam, and ye Shall be safe. [Tabari Volume 9]
The remaining inhabitants agreed to convert, and Muhammad sent a despatch (official report), making it known that he was happy with the result.

It is mentioned by Tabari that Khalid ibn al-Walid, stayed with them to teach them Islam, then returned with a deputation of the tribe to Muhammad. Muhammad criticised the tribe for previously defending themselves against him when his followers attacked them, he said "You are the ones when driven away would push forward.", and then said that if they did not surrender when Khalid was sent to them, he would have cut their heads off, he said:
"Had Khalid b. al-Walid not written to me that you had surrendered and had not fought, I would have thrown your heads underneath your feet."[Tabari Volume 9]

Muhammad then engaged in an argument with them about how they defeated previous tribes which attacked them.

Islamic primary sources

The event is partly mentioned in the Quran verse 3:61

The event is also mentioned by the Muslim Jurist Tabari, as follows:

Tabari said Abdullah ibn Abi Bakr was the narrator of the event. The information of the letters mentioned by Tabari in the above has also been collected by Muhammad Hamidullah (and he considers his letters authentic ). Muhammad Hamidullah collected 6 of Muhammad's letters whose original texts have been preserved, he compiled it in his French book Six Originaux des letters diplomatiques du Prophete e l'Islam. The translator of Tabari, The last Years of the Prophet, Isma'il Qurban Husayn, mentions in the footnote on page 83, that the letter mentioned by Tabari is also in the texts collected by Muhammad Hamidullah.

See also
Military career of Muhammad
List of expeditions of Muhammad

References

Notes

 Original from: University of Michigan. Note: Author wrote: “Maybe more will be known one day on the story of this precious document, and who has preserved it throughout centuries. In the present state of our knowledge, the trace of the tearing, the trace of the seald, the very old aspect of the greatest part of the writing greatest part of the writing and the conformity of the text with what the classical authors have cited incline us to believe it, at least for the time being, as authentic” about the letters he collected, throughout his book, he has sections called “The Original of the Letter” or similar.

Campaigns ordered by Muhammad
631